Live & Inspired is the first live album by American rock band Godsmack. Released on May 15, 2012, the album features live renditions of songs from each of the band's first four studio albums and includes a bonus disc of four cover version recordings.

Disc 1 of the album contains 13 tracks recorded during the band's performance at the Detroit Fox Theatre in 2007, with the band's lead singer, Sully Erna, stating that the venue has a "special kind of fan base". Although released two years after their then-latest studio album, The Oracle, the tracks were performed prior to the release of that album, thus none of its tracks show up on the set list.

Disc 2 contains various covers of other rock artists.

Track listing

Personnel

Godsmack
 Sully Erna – rhythm guitar, vocals, producer, drums, percussion, talk box on "Rocky Mountain Way"
 Tony Rombola – lead guitar, backing vocals
 Robbie Merrill – bass guitar
 Shannon Larkin – drums, percussion

Additional personnel
Chris DeCato – piano, keyboards on "Time" and "Nothing Else Matters"

References

2012 live albums
Godsmack albums